Wollman is a surname. Notable people with the surname include:

Élie Wollman (1917–2008), French microbial geneticist who first described plasmids
Harvey L. Wollman (1935-2022), American politician, the 26th Governor of South Dakota
Leo Wollman (1914–1998), New York doctor who assisted transsexuals with their transitions
Roger Leland Wollman (born 1934), federal judge on the United States Court of Appeals for the Eighth Circuit

See also
Wollman Rink, public ice rink in the southern part of Central Park, Manhattan, New York City

Hollman
Hollmann

Holman (disambiguation)
Ohlman

Owlman
Ullman

Wallimann
Wallmann

Wellman (disambiguation)
Wellmann

Welman
Willeman

Willman
Willmann

Wollamai
Wolman